The Cabinet of Cambodia, officially known as the Office of the Council of Ministers, is the executive body of the Kingdom of Cambodia led by the Prime Minister, assisted by Deputy Prime Ministers, Senior Ministers, Ministers, and Secretaries of State. Members of the Cabinet are nominated by the Prime Minister and appointed by the Monarch.

Role
Chapter VIII of the Constitution states the role of the Royal Government of Cambodia. 
Article 99: The Council of Ministers is the Royal Government of Cambodia. The Council of Ministers shall be led by one Prime Minister assisted by Deputy Prime Ministers, and by State Ministers, Ministers, and State Secretaries as members. 
Article 100: At the recommendation of the President and with the agreement of both Vice-Presidents of the Assembly, the King shall designate a dignitary from among the representatives of the winning party to form the Royal Government. This designated Assembly or members of the political parties represented in from the Assembly. After the Assembly has given its vote of confidence, the King shall issue a Royal decree (Kret) appointing the entire Council of Ministers. Before taking office, the Council of Ministers shall take an oath as stipulated an Annex 6. 
Article 101: The functions of members of the Royal Government shall be incompatible with professional activities in trade or industry and with the holding of any position in the public service. 
Article 102: Members of the Royal Government shall be collectively responsible to the Assembly for the overall policy of the Royal Government. Each member of the Royal Government shall be individually responsible to the Prime Minister and the Assembly for his/her own conduct. 
Article 103: Members of the Royal Government shall not use the orders, written or verbal, of anyone as grounds to exonerate themselves form their responsibility.
Article 104: The Council of Minister shall meet every week inn plenary session or in a working session. The Prime Minister shall chair the plenary sessions. The Prime Minister may assign a Deputy Prime Minister to preside over the working sessions. Minutes of the Council of Ministers' meeting shall be forwarded to the King for His information. 
Article 105: The Prime Minister shall have the right to delegate his power to a Deputy Prime Minister or to any member of the Royal Government. 
Article 106: If the post of Prime Minister is permanently vacant, a new Council of Ministers shall be appointed under the procedure stipulated in this Constitution. If the vacancy is temporary, an acting Prime Minister shall be provisionally appointed. 
Article 107:Each member of the Royal Government shall be punished for any crimes or misdemeanors that he/she has committed in the course of his/her duty. In such cases and when his/her duty, the Assembly shall decide to file charges against him/her with competent. The Assembly shall decide on such matters though a secret vote by a simple majority thereof. 
Article 108: The organization and functioning of the Council of Ministers shall be determined by law.

Current cabinet

 
The members of the sixth and current Council of Ministers were sworn in on 6 September 2018. The National Assembly voted Hun Sen as Prime Minister for another five-year term.

References

External links
 Official website

Politics of Cambodia
Government of Cambodia
National cabinets